The Veneridae or venerids, common name: Venus clams, are a very large family of minute to large, saltwater clams, marine bivalve molluscs. Over 500 living species of venerid bivalves are known, most of which are edible, and many of which are exploited as food sources.

Many of the most important edible species are commonly known (in the USA) simply as "clams". Venerids make up a significant proportion of the world fishery of edible bivalves. The family includes some species that are important commercially, such as (in the USA) the hard clam or quahog, Mercenaria mercenaria.

Taxonomy
The classification within the family Veneridae has been controversial at least since the 1930s. Molecular approaches show that much of this traditional classification is unnatural. Some common species have been moved between genera (including genera in different subfamilies) because of repeated attempts to bring a more valid organization to the classification or taxonomy of the family, therefore changes in the generic name of species are frequently encountered. 

The characters used for classifying this group still tend to be superficial, focusing on external features, especially those of the shell. Venerid clams are characterized as bivalves with an external posterior ligament, usually a well demarcated anterior area known as the lunule, and three interlocking structures (called cardinal teeth) in the top of each valve; several of the subfamilies also have anterior lateral teeth, anterior to the cardinal teeth: one in the left valve, and two (sometimes obscure) in the right valve. The inner lower peripheries of the valves can be finely toothed or smooth.

Classification

The following genera are recognised in the family Veneridae:

Description 

Shell sculpture tends to be primarily concentric, but radial and divaricating ornamentation (see Gafrarium), and rarely spines (Pitar lupanaria for example) occur on some. One small subfamily, the Samarangiinae, is created for a unique and rare clam found in coral reefs with an outer covering of cemented sand or mud that texturally camouflages it while enhancing the thickness of the shell. Several venerid clams have overall shell shapes adapted to their environments. Tivela species, for example, have the triangular outline of the surf clams in other bivalve families, and occur often in surf zones. Some Dosinia species are almost disc-like in shape and reminiscent of lucinid bivalves; both types of circular bivalves tend to burrow relatively deeply into the sediment. Further reclassification is to be expected as the results of current research in molecular systematics on the group appear in the literature.

Venerids have rounded or oval solid shells with the umbones (projections) inturned towards the anterior end. Three or four cardinal teeth are on each valve. The siphons are short and united, except at the tip, and are not very long. The foot is large.

References 

 Keen, A. M. (1969). Superfamily Veneracea. pp. 670–690, in: Leslie Reginald Cox et al., Part N [Bivalvia], Mollusca 6, vols. 1 and 2: xxxvii + 952 pp. Part of Raymond C. Moore, ed., Treatise on Invertebrate Paleontology. Lawrence, Kansas (Geological Society of America & University of Kansas).
 Powell A. W. B., New Zealand Mollusca, William Collins Publishers Ltd, Auckland, New Zealand 1979

Gallery

External links 

 Taxonomy on the half shell A major project of the Chicago Field Museum of Natural History and the American Museum of Natural History on Venerid classification
 Bibliography of venerid taxonomy
 VENERIDAE - www.chez.com
 ZipCodeZoo

 

Bivalve families
Taxa named by Constantine Samuel Rafinesque